The Prix Sainte-Beuve, established in 1946, is a French literary prize awarded each year to a writer in the categories "novels" (or "poetry") and "essays" (or "critics"); it is named after the writer Charles-Augustin Sainte-Beuve. The founding jury included Raymond Aron, Maurice Blanchot, Maurice Nadeau, Jean Paulhan and Raymond Queneau.

Laureates 
1946: Georges Navel for Travaux
1946: Raymond Abellio for Heureux les pacifiques
1947: Victor Kravtchenko for J'ai choisi la liberté
1947: Julien Blanc for Seule la vie Tome 2, Joyeux, fais ton fourbi...
1947 (January 1948): Armand Hoog for L'accident
1947 (January 1948): Antonin Artaud for Van Gogh ou le suicide de la société
1948: André Dhôtel for David
1948: Louis Martin-Chauffier for L'Homme et la bête
1949: Gilbert Cesbron for Notre prison est un royaume
1949: Claude Mauriac for André Breton
1949: Lise Deharme for La porte à côté
1949: Claude-Edmonde Magny for L'Âge d'or du roman américain
1950: François Gorrec for La Septième Lune
1950: Jean-Charles Pichon for Il faut que je tue M. Rumann
1951: Georges Poulet for Études sur le temps humain
1952: Pierre Boulle for The Bridge over the River Kwai
1952: René Étiemble for Le Mythe de Rimbaud
1953: Pierre Moinot for 
1954: Suzanne Lilar for Le Journal de l'analogiste
1955: Jean-Claude Brisville for D'un amour
1956: Henri Thomas for La Cible
1956: André Brincourt for Les Œuvres et les lumières
1957: Alexis Curvers for Tempo di Roma
1957: Alain Bosquet for Poèmes - Les Testaments - Tome 1 (ou Premier testament)
1957: Emil Cioran for La tentation d'exister  (refused)
1958: Mongo Beti for Mission Terminée
1958: Jean Cathelin for Marcel Aymé ou le paysan de Paris
1959: Gilbert Prouteau for La Peur des femmes
1961: Robert Abirached for Casanova ou la Dissipation
1961: Patrick Waldberg for Promenoir de Paris
1962: Jérôme Peignot for L’Or des fous
1962: Robert Poulet for Contre l'amour
1963: Alphonse Boudard for La Cerise
1963: Bernard Delvaille for Essai sur Valery Larbaud
1964: Michel Breitman for Sébastien
1965: Roger Rabiniaux for Le Soleil des dortoirs
1966: Daniel Boulanger for Le Chemin des caracoles
1966: Jean-Claude Renard for La terre du sacre
1968: Lucie Faure for L'Autre personne
1968: Marc Soriano for les Contes de Perrault, culture savante et tradition populaire
1969: Pierre Schaeffer for Le Gardien de volcan
1969: Jean-Pierre Attal for L'Image "métaphysique" et autres essais
1982: Laurence Cossé for 
1983: Michel Luneau for Folle-alliée
1984: Vladan Radoman for Le Ravin
1985: Marie-Claire Bancquart for Anatole France, un sceptique passionné
1986: Rafaël Pividal for Grotius
1987: Boris Schreiber for La Traversée du dimanche
1987: Éric Ollivier for Les livres dans la peau

Prix Sainte-Beuve des collégiens
In 2008 a Prix Sainte-Beuve des collégiens, also called Prix Sainte-Beuve des collégiens et des apprentis was created. An interschool contest literary critic takes place before the election of a youth novel by college students and apprentices. Designed and coordinated by Pierric Maelstaf, this price is borne by the association "çà & là" and the County Council of Pas-de-Calais.

List of laureates 
 
2008: Hélène Vignal for Passé au rouge
2009: Yaël Hassan for Suivez-moi jeune homme
2010: Gemma Malley for La Déclaration
2011: Julia Billet for Sayonara samouraï
2012: Jay Asher for Treize Raisons
2013: Yves Grevet for Seuls dans la ville
2014: Florence Hinckel for Théa pour l'éternité
2015: Isabelle Pandazopoulos for "La Décision"

References

External links 
 Prix Sainte-Beuve on the site of the académie française

 
French literary awards
Awards established in 1946
1946 establishments in France